The 2022 City of Playford Tennis International was a professional tennis tournament played on outdoor hard courts. It was the fourth edition of the tournament which was part of the 2022 ATP Challenger Tour and the 2022 ITF Women's World Tennis Tour. It took place in the City of Playford, Australia between 24 and 30 October 2022.

Champions

Men's singles

  Rinky Hijikata def.  Rio Noguchi 6–1, 6–1.

Women's singles

  Kimberly Birrell def.  Maddison Inglis, 3–6, 7–5, 6–4

Men's doubles

  Jeremy Beale /  Calum Puttergill def.  Rio Noguchi /  Yusuke Takahashi 7–6(7–2), 6–4.

Women's doubles

  Alexandra Bozovic /  Talia Gibson def.  Han Na-lae /  Priska Madelyn Nugroho, 7–5, 6–4

Men's singles main draw entrants

Seeds

 1 Rankings are as of 17 October 2022.

Other entrants
The following players received wildcards into the singles main draw:
  Alex Bolt
  Blake Ellis
  Edward Winter

The following player received entry into the singles main draw using a protected ranking:
  Jeremy Beale

The following players received entry from the qualifying draw:
  Jeremy Jin
  Blake Mott
  Calum Puttergill
  Ajeet Rai
  Luke Saville
  Yusuke Takahashi

Women's singles main draw entrants

Seeds

 1 Rankings are as of 17 October 2022.

Other entrants
The following players received entry from the qualifying draw:
  Natsuho Arakawa
  Roopa Bains
  Monique Barry
  Petra Hule
  Lisa Mays
  Kaylah McPhee
  Sara Nayar
  Sarah-Rebecca Sekulic

References

External links
 2022 City of Playford Tennis International at ITFtennis.com
 Official website

2022 ATP Challenger Tour
2022 ITF Women's World Tennis Tour
2022 in Australian tennis
October 2022 sports events in Australia